A list of crime films released in the 1980s.

Notes

Crime films
1980s